Christian Joseph DiLauro (born November 11, 1994) is an American football offensive tackle for the Denver Broncos of the National Football League (NFL). He played college football at Illinois. DiLauro signed with the Cleveland Browns as an undrafted free agent in 2018 and has also been a member of several other NFL teams.

College career
DiLauro started 38 games for Illinois. In 2014, he was named to the Big Ten All-Freshman team.

Professional career

Cleveland Browns
DiLauro went undrafted in the 2018 NFL Draft. On May 4, 2018, he was signed by the Cleveland Browns. DiLauro was waived on September 1, but was re-signed two days later to the Browns' practice squad. On September 4, 2018, DiLauro was cut from the Browns' practice squad.

San Francisco 49ers
On September 26, 2018, DiLauro was signed to the San Francisco 49ers' practice squad. He signed a reserve/future contract with the 49ers on January 2, 2019. He was waived on August 21, 2019.

Houston Texans
DiLauro signed with the Houston Texans on August 25, 2019. On August 30, DiLauro was released. On September 25, DiLauro was signed to the practice squad. He was released on October 1.

Pittsburgh Steelers
On October 15, 2019, DiLauro was signed to the Pittsburgh Steelers practice squad. On December 30, he was signed by the Steelers to a reserve/future contract. He was waived on September 5, 2020.

Tennessee Titans
On May 26, 2021, DiLauro signed with the Tennessee Titans. He was waived on August 31, 2021 and re-signed to the practice squad. He was released on September 10 and re-signed to the practice squad four days later. 

On December 23, 2021, DiLauro was promoted to the active roster and made his NFL debut in the Titans' week 16 game against the San Francisco 49ers. After the Titans were eliminated in the Divisional Round of the 2021 playoffs, he signed a reserve/future contract on January 24, 2022. On August 30, 2022, DiLauro was waived by the Titans and re-signed to the practice squad on September 21, 2022. He was released on October 4.

Washington Commanders
DiLauro signed with the practice squad of the Washington Commanders on October 5, 2022. He was released on October 19.

Denver Broncos
On October 24, 2022, DiLauro signed with the practice squad of the Denver Broncos. He was promoted to the active roster on December 19.

References

External links
Washington Commanders bio
Illinois Fighting Illini bio

1994 births
Living people
People from Uniontown, Ohio
Players of American football from Ohio
American football offensive tackles
Illinois Fighting Illini football players
Cleveland Browns players
San Francisco 49ers players
Houston Texans players
Pittsburgh Steelers players
The Spring League players
Tennessee Titans players
Washington Commanders players